EXALEAD  is a software company, created in 2000, that provided search platforms and search-based applications (SBA)  for consumer and business users. The company is headquartered in Paris, France, and is a subsidiary of Dassault Systèmes.

CloudView 
The company's CloudView product is search and information access software used for both online and enterprise search-based applications as well as enterprise search. CloudView combines Web-scale semantic technologies, rapid drag-and-drop application development and hybrid quantitative/qualitative analytics to deliver a consumer-style information experience to mission-critical business processes. In the case of structured data, the SBA index replaces a traditional relational database structure as the primary vehicle for information access and reporting.

Exalabs 
The CloudView product is also the platform for Exalead's public Web search engine,  which was designed to apply semantic processing and faceted navigation to Web data volumes and usage. Exalead also operates an online laboratory which uses the Web as a medium for developing applied technologies for business.

Many of Exalabs projects are developed in conjunction with Exalead's partners in the Quaero project.

History 
Exalead was founded in 2000 by François Bourdoncle and Patrice Bertin (both of whom were involved in the development of the Alta Vista search engine), and began commercializing its products in 2005. Exalead employed approximately 150 people.
 
On 8 June 2010, Dassault Systèmes acquired Exalead for 135 million Euros. 
Since then, many startups have sprung from Exalead such as Dataiku founded by Florian Douetteau, former vice president and then CEO of Dataiku, a French analytics software editor.

References

External links
 Exalead search engine

Internet search engines
Desktop search engines